Montpellier Paillade Basket was a French basketball club, based in the city of Montpellier. The club has evolved among the elite of French basketball (N1A and Pro) for 14 seasons between 1989 and 2002, but was dissolved in 2002 after filing for bankruptcy that same year.

History
Created in 1982, following the merger of clubs "AS Paillade" and "Juvignac", the club was taken over by Louis Nicollin in the mid 80s and became the basketball section of Montpellier Paillade Sports Club (MPSC). In 1989, under pressure from the municipality, the section takes its autonomy under the name Montpellier Basketball and now plays in blue and white. The club will then take the appellation Montpellier Paillade Basketball to emphasize its roots in the district of Paillade where is the Palace of Pierre de Coubertin sports.

Honours & achievements
French League
 Quarter-finalists (4): 1988–89, 1992–93, 1994–95, 1996–97
French League 2
 Champions (1): 1987–88
French Federation Cup
 Runners-up (1): 1987

Notable players

 Hervé Dubuisson
 James Scott
 Troy Brown
- Tony Windless
 Todd Mitchell

Head coaches
 Pierre Galle
 Hervé Dubuisson

References

Basketball teams in France
Basketball teams established in 1982
Sport in Montpellier